Wauchula is a city in south-central Florida in Hardee County, Florida, United States. As of the 2010 census it had a population of 5,001, up from 4,368 at the 2000 census. It is the county seat of Hardee County.

Wauchula has been called the "cucumber capital of the world", although citrus has become a more important agricultural crop over the past few decades. It is home to the Downtown Wauchula Historic District and Albert Carlton Estate.

Geography
Wauchula is located in north-central Hardee County. U.S. Route 17 passes through the city, leading north  to Bartow and south  to Arcadia.

Hurricane Charley
The entire area had either no running water, or contaminated water for one week. Power was lost to many sections for nearly three weeks, with school canceled for two weeks. The area was declared a federal disaster area after 85% of its buildings were either damaged or destroyed. There was a curfew set for the area for weeks after from 8 pm to 7 am.

Climate

The climate in this area is characterized by hot, humid summers and warm winters. According to the Köppen climate classification system, Wauchula has a humid subtropical climate (Cfa).

Demographics

As of the census of 2000, there were 4,368 people, 1,431 households, and 985 families residing in the city. The racial makeup of the city was 73.44% White, 4.17% African American, 0.57% Native American, 0.30% Asian, 18.84% from other races, and 2.68% from two or more races. Hispanic or Latino of any race were 39.42% of the population.

There were 1,431 households, out of which 36.5% had children under the age of 18 living with them, 48.9% were married couples living together, 14.8% had a female householder with no husband present, and 31.1% were non-families. 26.5% of all households were made up of individuals, and 13.1% had someone living alone who was 65 years of age or older. The average household size was 2.97 and the average family size was 3.57.

In the city, the population was spread out, with 30.7% under the age of 18, 11.6% from 18 to 24, 26.9% from 25 to 44, 17.1% from 45 to 64, and 13.7% who were 65 years of age or older. The median age was 30 years. For every 100 females, there were 98.5 males. For every 100 females age 18 and over, there were 96.7 males.

The median income for a household in the city was $25,931, and the median income for a family was $29,943. Males had a median income of $19,129 versus $15,867 for females. The per capita income for the city was $10,665. About 19.9% of families and 25.0% of the population were below the poverty line, including 30.0% of those under age 18 and 12.8% of those age 65 or over.

In 2010 Wauchula had a population of 5,001. The racial and ethnic composition of the population was 43.6% non-Hispanic white, 5.9% black or African American, 0.9% Native American, 1.0% Asian, 0.1% non-Hispanic of some other race, 2.3% from two or more races and 48.6% Hispanic or Latino. 44.7% of the population was Mexican.

Infrastructure

Center for Great Apes is a permanent sanctuary for rescued orangutans and chimpanzees.

Notable people

 Doyle E. Carlton (1885–1972), 25th governor of Florida
 Tom McEwen (1923–2011), sportswriter
 B. J. McLeod (born 1983), NASCAR driver
 Zeke Mowatt (born 1961), NFL football player and Super Bowl XXI champion

See also

 List of municipalities in Florida
 National Register of Historic Places listings in Hardee County, Florida

References

External links
 

 

1902 establishments in Florida
Cities in Florida
Cities in Hardee County, Florida
County seats in Florida
Micropolitan areas of Florida
Populated places established in 1902